Peter Bartholomew Teets (born February 12, 1942, died November 29, 2020) was the thirteenth Director of the National Reconnaissance Office and the Under Secretary of the Air Force.

Mr. Teets engineered the formation of a comprehensive national security space enterprise, laying the groundwork for the integration of open and classified space activities in support of national security objectives. He commissioned panels on space acquisition policies and space launch initiatives. He greatly improved the acquisition, operation, and effectiveness of national security space capabilities.

Education
1963 Bachelor of science degree in applied mathematics, University of Colorado, Boulder

1965 Master of science degree in applied mathematics, University of Colorado, Denver

1978 Master of science degree in management, Massachusetts Institute of Technology, Cambridge

Career Chronology
1. 1963-1970, engineer for flight control analysis, Martin Marietta, Denver, Colo.

2. 1970-1975, manager, Titan IIIC inertial guidance system, Martin Marietta, Denver, Colo.

3. 1975-1980, Program Manager, Transtage Project, and Director of Space Systems, Martin Marietta, Denver, Colo.

4. 1980-1982, Vice President of Business Development, Martin Marietta Denver Aerospace, Denver, Colo.

5. 1982-1985, Vice President and General Manager, Aerospace Strategic and Launch Systems Division, Martin Marietta Denver Aerospace, Denver, Colo.

6. 1985-1993, President, Martin Marietta Denver Aerospace, Denver, Colo.

7. 1993-1995, President, Martin Marietta Space Group, Bethesda, Md.

8. 1995-1997, President and Chief Operating Officer, Lockheed Martin Information and Services Sector, Bethesda, Md.

9. 1997-1999, President and Chief Operating Officer, Lockheed Martin Corp., Bethesda, Md.

10. 2001-2005, Undersecretary of the Air Force, Washington, D.C.

11. 2005-, Board of Trustees, The Aerospace Corporation, El Segundo, Ca.

Awards and honors
Sloan Fellow

1990 Honorary Doctor of Science Degree, University of Colorado

2004 W. Stuart Symington Award (for most significant contribution by a civilian for national defense)

2009 Gen. James E. Hill Lifetime Space Achievement Award

Wernher von Braun Space Flight Trophy

Bob Hope Distinguished Citizen Award

On 7 October 2016, Teets was inducted into the Colorado Space Hall of Fame.

PROFESSIONAL MEMBERSHIPS AND ASSOCIATIONS

Fellow, American Institute of Aeronautics and Astronautics

Fellow, American Astronautical Society

National Academy of Engineering

References

External links
National Reconnaissance Office: Directors List
USAF Biography

Directors of the National Reconnaissance Office
Living people
1942 births
George W. Bush administration personnel
Members of the United States National Academy of Engineering
American chief operating officers
University of Colorado Boulder alumni
University of Colorado Denver alumni
Massachusetts Institute of Technology alumni